Prisoner of the Judoon is the first serial of the third series of The Sarah Jane Adventures. It was first broadcast on 15 and 16 October 2009.

The episode involves Judoon Captain Tybo chasing down an escaped prisoner on Earth charged with the destruction of twelve planets.

Plot
An alien life pod is ejected ten miles from the impact zone of a Judoon spaceship and crashes into an abandoned council estate. After tracking the pod, Sarah Jane is possessed by the pod's occupant, the escaped Veil prisoner Androvax. Androvax is charged with the destruction of twelve planets after witnessing the destruction of his own planet. He uses the supercomputer in Sarah Jane's attic, Mr Smith, to access the schematics of a spaceship that the United States military re-engineered from the debris at the Roswell incident. From these schematics, Androvax makes the nanoforms at a nanotechnology company construct a new spaceship. 

Assisted by the Judoon Captain Tybo, Luke, Clyde, and Rani follow the possessed Sarah Jane and Androvax to the nanotechnology company. Androvax releases the nanoforms, which threaten to destroy the Earth in the process. Luke, Clyde, and Rani use a ruse to lock Captain Tybo in a lab room and confront the possessed Sarah Jane. The team tries to encourage the real Sarah Jane to fight back against possession, but Androvax deceives Luke and puts him in a trance. Androvax takes the revived Luke onto the completed spaceship.

The Judoon rescue mission free Captain Tybo, and then everyone converges in the spacecraft's control room. Androvax, having been forced by Luke to leave Sarah Jane's body, is arrested by the Judoon. Luke uses the ship's controls to deactivate the nanobots. The Judoon charge Clyde and Rani with interference, but take the pair's assistance and motives as mitigating factors, limiting their punishment to a bar against extraterrestrial travel. The Judoon leave Earth with Androvax.

Production notes
Beginning with the first part of this story, a short 30 second introduction to the series and its main characters was presented by Daniel Anthony in character as Clyde. The introduction would remain for the rest of the series with updated clips for each new season.

Novelisation

Pearson Education published a simplified novelisation of this episode by Trevor Baxendale under the title Judoon Afternoon for school literacy programs in September 2010.

References

External links

The Sarah Jane Adventures episodes
2009 British television episodes
Television episodes about nanotechnology